Owendo is a port city in Gabon, forming a south western suburb of Libreville.

History 
In 1978, the Trans-Gabon Railway was connected to the city.

Industry 

Owendo has a cement works.

See also 

 List of deep water ports 
 Cement in Africa

References 

Populated places in Estuaire Province
Port cities and towns in Gabon
Ports and harbours of Gabon